Zinal is a village in Switzerland, located in the municipality of Anniviers in the canton of Valais. With the Dent Blanche, four additional  peaks are located around the valley: Bishorn, Weisshorn, Zinalrothorn, and Ober Gabelhorn.

Tourism 
In summer the area has  of marked trails and some mountain huts such as the Grand Mountet Hut in the middle of glaciers.

References

External links 

 

Ski areas and resorts in Switzerland
Villages in Valais
Anniviers